α-Vetivone  is an organic compound that is classified as a sesquiterpene (derived from three isoprene units).  It is a major component of the oil of vetiver, which is used to prepare certain high value perfumes.

α-Vetivone is isolated by steam distillation of the roots of the grass Vetiveria zizanioides. Two other components of this distillate are the sesquiterpenes khusimol and β-vetivone shown below.

References

Perfume ingredients
Ketones
Sesquiterpenes
Bicyclic compounds